Rencine is a village in Tuscany, central Italy, administratively a frazione of the comune of Castellina in Chianti, province of Siena.

Rencine is about 23 km from Siena and 15 km from Castellina in Chianti.

References 

Frazioni of Castellina in Chianti